Hamadryas was a nymph, the mother of the hamadryads in Greek mythology, and the name has been used repeatedly in scientific naming and may refer to:

Genera
 Hamadryas (butterfly), a genus of brush-footed butterflies
 Hamadryas (plant), a genus of plants

Species epithet
 The hamadryas baboon, Papio hamadryas

Rejected scientific names
 As a proposed (but rejected) generic name for the king cobra, a snake
 As a junior synonym generic name for the Tellervini, milkweed butterflies
 As a junior synonym generic name for the owl butterfly, genus Caligo, a group of butterflies with large spots
 As a junior synonym generic name for a proposed monotypic genus for Euclemensia woodiella, a rare British moth
 As a junior synonym species epithet for the lung breathing snail Bulimus eurystomus